Il Boss (En. The Boss, also known as Murder Inferno) is a poliziottesco-noir film written and directed by Fernando Di Leo in 1973. It is the final part of Di Leo's Milieu Trilogy, also consisting of Milano calibro 9 and La mala ordina, both released in 1972.

Plot
Nick Lanzetta (Henry Silva) takes out several members of a rival crime family for his boss Don Corrasco (Richard Conte). The enemy clan attempts retribution by kidnapping an associate's daughter, who turns out to be a nymphomaniac. A violent power struggle within the Mafia ensues.

Cast
Henry Silva: Nick Lanzetta
Richard Conte: Don Corrasco
Gianni Garko: Commissioner Torri
Vittorio Caprioli: the Quaestor
Pier Paolo Capponi: Cocchi
Antonia Santilli: Rina Daniello 
Claudio Nicastro: Don Giuseppe Daniello
Corrado Gaipa: Lawyer Rizzo
Gianni Musy: Carlo Attardi
Mario Pisu: On. Gabrielli
Marino Masé: Pignataro
Howard Ross: Melende

Release
Il Boss was released in Italy on 1 February 1973, where it was distributed by Alherat. The film grossed a total of ₤774.172 million Italian lira on its release.

References

Footnotes

Sources

External links
 

1973 films
1970s action thriller films
1970s Italian-language films
Films about kidnapping
Films about the Sicilian Mafia
Films based on crime novels
Poliziotteschi films
Films directed by Fernando Di Leo
1970s crime thriller films
Films scored by Luis Bacalov
1970s Italian films